The Dolodrook River is a perennial river of the West Gippsland catchment, located in the Alpine region of the Australian state of Victoria.

Features and location
The Dolodrook River rises below Gable End within the Snowy Range of the Great Dividing Range. The river flows through parts of the Alpine National Park, generally west, then west by north, then north, before reaching its confluence with the Wellington River in a remote state forestry area in the Shire of Wellington. The river descends  over its  course.

See also

Rivers of Victoria

References

External links
 
 

West Gippsland catchment
Rivers of Gippsland (region)
Victorian Alps